Anthony (Ant) Nicholls is a physicist and entrepreneur from Plympton, Plymouth, England.

Education
Nicholls first studied Physics at Oxford before joining the Institute for Molecular Biophysics at Florida State University. There he studied quantum dispersion of excitations in biological systems with William Rhodes and football with Bobby Bowden. He earned his Ph.D. in biophysics in 1988 and began a post-doc with Barry Honig at Columbia University, New York.

Software development
Nicholls has largely worked in molecular biophysics, designing software that is used in drug discovery applications.

While at Columbia University, he re-wrote the electrostatics program known as DelPhi. DelPhi took input from a coordinate file format of a molecule and calculated the electrostatic potential in and around the system, using a finite difference solution to the Poisson-Boltzmann equation.

Nicholls later wrote the graphics software GRASP. GRASP was graphics program written for Silicon Graphics computers that was used by the structural biology community to visualize macromolecules. It was the most widely used software for computing and displaying polyhedral molecular surfaces during the 1990s.

Business
Work conducted on DelPhi and GRASP continues to be the intellectual property of Columbia University. As a result, Nicholls consulted with David Weininger, and decided in 1997 to found OpenEye in Santa Fe, New Mexico Nicholls has also been referred to as the "Steve Jobs of the Info Mesa" in regard to his work at OpenEye. OpenEye has employed a number of notable people in cheminformatics, including Roger Sayle, developer of RasMol.

References

External links
 OpenEye Web Site

Living people
Year of birth missing (living people)
People from Santa Fe, New Mexico
English businesspeople
Alumni of St John's College, Oxford
Florida State University alumni
Columbia University staff
British physicists